= Where Did the Music Go =

2026 studio album by JT Curtis

Studio album by JT Curtis
- Released: January 20, 2026
- Genre: Progressive rock
- Length: 43:44

Where Did the Music Go is a progressive rock album released on January 20, 2026, by JT Curtis. It is a concept album that explores a dystopian future in which artificial intelligence has taken control of music creation and distribution.

== Background and concept ==
The album is set in a futuristic society where music is generated and controlled by AI. The album follows underground human musicians who continue to make live and non-AI generated music.

Curtis has described the album as a conceptual work focused on preserving the human element of music in a technology dominated world.

== Track listing ==
1. Exo
2. How Did We Get Here
3. Welcome to the Underground
4. Reality
5. Walk of Shame
6. Reprise
7. Apocalypse
8. Where Did the Music Go
